Louis Réard (10 October 1896 – 16 September 1984) was a French automobile engineer and clothing designer who introduced the modern two-piece bikini in July 1946. He opened a bikini shop and ran it for the next 40 years.

Launching the bikini

Réard was an automotive engineer who took over his mother's lingerie business in about 1940 and became a clothing designer near Les Folies Bergères in Paris. While on Saint Tropez beaches, he noticed women rolling up the edges of their swimsuits to get a better tan, which inspired him to design a swimsuit with the midriff exposed.

In May 1946, Jacques Heim produced a two-piece swimsuit that he named the "Atome,"  which he advertised as the world's "smallest bathing suit". The bottom of Heim's swimsuit was just large enough to cover the wearer's navel. To promote his new design, Heim hired skywriters to fly above the Mediterranean resort advertising the Atome as "the world’s smallest bathing suit."

Réard quickly produced his own swimsuit design which was a string bikini consisting of four triangles made from only  of fabric printed with a newspaper pattern. When Réard sought a model to wear his design at its debut presentation, none of the usual models would wear the suit, so he hired 19-year-old nude dancer Micheline Bernardini from the Casino de Paris to model it.

He introduced his new swimsuit, which he named the bikini, to the media and public in Paris on 5 July 1946 at Piscine Molitor, a popular public pool in Paris at the time.

He introduced his design four days after the first test of a nuclear weapon at the Bikini Atoll. The newspapers were full of news about it and Reard hoped for the same with his design. Not to be outdone by Heim, Réard hired his own skywriters to fly over the French Riviera advertising his design as "smaller than the smallest bathing suit in the world." Photographs of Bernardini and articles about the event were widely carried by the press. The International Herald Tribune alone ran nine stories on the event. Fourteen days later, Réard applied for a patent for his design, and was awarded patent number 19431.

Two piece swimsuits had been available for at least since the 1930s, but Réard's bikini was controversial because for the first time the wearer's navel was exposed.

Marketing of the bikini

The bikini was very popular, especially among men, and Bernardini received some 50,000 fan letters. Heim's design was the first worn on the beach, but Réard's name for it stuck in the public consciousness. Réard's business soared, and in advertisements he kept the bikini mystique alive by declaring that a two-piece suit wasn't a genuine bikini "unless it could be pulled through a wedding ring."

As a further booster for sales, Réard commissioned carbody specialist Chapron to build an extravagant "road yacht" by converting a Packard V8 car into a mock luxury cabin cruiser complete with cockpit, portholes, anchor, signal mast and other nautical regalia. The car (not an amphibian) went on advertising parades and followed the Tour de France cycliste in the early 1950s, with a crew of bikini clad girls, causing quite a sensation in period parochial France.

Later life
Réard afterwards opened a bikini shop in Paris and sold swimsuits for 40 years. In 1980, Réard moved with his wife, Marcelle Réard, from France to Lausanne, Switzerland. He died in Lausanne in 1984 at the age of 87.

Notes

External links

1897 births
1984 deaths
French fashion designers
Bikinis
Date of birth unknown